This is a list of the Canadian Billboard magazine Canadian Hot 100 number-ones of 2012.

Note that Billboard publishes charts with an issue date approximately 7–10 days in advance.

Chart history

See also
List of number-one albums of 2012 (Canada)
List of number-one digital songs of 2012 (Canada)

References

Canada Hot 100
2012
2012 in Canadian music